Kashmakash may refer to:
 Kashmakash (album), a 1995 compilation album by Junoon
 Kashmakash (1973 film), an Indian Hindi-language film
 Kashmakash, the Hindi-language dubbed version of Noukadubi

See also
 Kash-m-kash, an Indian drama television series